HMS Loyalist was the 14-gun sloop Restoration, which the Royal Navy purchased in North America in 1779. In May 1781 her captain was Morgan Laugharne.

In 1780 Admiral Arbuthnot placed John Plumer Ardesoife in command of Loyalist. He immediately proceeded to terrorize the inhabitants of the Sea Islands, arousing opposition to the British. Around this time Loyalist took the sloop George, of 25 tons burthen, William Stein master. George was condemned at the vice admiralty court in Savannah on 23 August 1780. While under Ardesoife's command Loyalist also took some prizes at George Town.

She was under the command of Captain Richard Williams when the French captured her in the Chesapeake on 30 August 1781. According to French sources, Loyalist and the frigate  were on picket duty when they encountered the French fleet under Admiral de Grasse. Guadeloupe escaped up the York River to York Town, where her crew would later scuttle her. The English court martial records report that Loyalist was returning to the British fleet off the Jersey coast when she encountered the main French fleet. The , with the 74-gun  in sight, was able to overtake Loyalist.

The French took her into service as Loyaliste in September. On 15 September she arrived at Yorktown, De Grasse having detached her to escort in some grenadiers and chasseurs. Her commander, briefly, was lieutenant de vaisseau  
Pascal Melchior Philibert de Barras-Saint-Laurent, son of Admiral de Barras.

Shortly thereafter, in November, the French gave her to the Americans. In her brief French service she is described as carrying 22 guns, probably 14 guns plus eight swivel guns.

Citations and references
Citations

References
 
 
 Gallatin, Gaspard Gabriel (1931) Journal of the siege of York-town: unpublished journal of the siege of York-town in 1781 operated by the General staff of the French army. (Washington:United States Government Printing Office).
 
 

Sloops of the Royal Navy
1770s ships
Captured ships